The 2014 Irving Tennis Classic was a professional tennis tournament played on hard courts. It was the third edition of the tournament which will be part of the 2014 ATP Challenger Tour. It took place in Irving, United States between 10 and 16 March 2013.

Singles main-draw entrants

Seeds

 1 Rankings are as of March 10, 2014.

Other entrants
The following players received wildcards into the singles main draw:
  Jean Anderson
  Rajeev Ram
  Bobby Reynolds
  Mischa Zverev

The following players received entry from the qualifying draw:
  Alex Kuznetsov
  Illya Marchenko
  Rhyne Williams
  Jimmy Wang

Champions

Singles

 Lukáš Rosol def.  Steve Johnson, 6–0, 6–3

Doubles

 Santiago González /  Scott Lipsky def.  John-Patrick Smith /  Michael Venus, 4–6, 7–6(9–7), [10–7]

External links
Official Website 

Irving Tennis Classic
Irving Tennis Classic
Irving Tennis Classic
Irving Tennis Classic